Fairfield is a ward in the London Borough of Croydon, covering most of the Croydon area of London in the United Kingdom. The ward currently forms part of the Croydon Central parliamentary constituency, except for a small area near West Croydon station which is part of the Croydon North constituency. The population of the ward at the 2011 Census was 16,569.

The ward returns three councillors every four years. At the 2006 Croydon Council election, David Fitze, Vidhi Mohan and Sue Winborn were elected to the council. All of them stood as Conservative Party candidates. The turnout in the ward was similar to others in the area.

Fairfield contains Croydon town centre, with its retail and office core. Until 2018, it also contained Park Hill and the Whitgift Estate to the east which is mostly 20th century housing bordering Lloyd Park. These became a separate Park Hill and Whitgift ward in 2018, leading to the Fairfield ward now having a radically different character to before. Also found in the ward are Ruskin House, the headquarters of the Croydon Labour Party, and the Fairfield Halls concert hall and arts centre. The Vanguard Way passes along the Fairfield Path.

List of Councillors

Mayoral election results 
Below are the results for the candidate which received the highest share of the popular vote in the ward at each mayoral election.

Ward Results

2018 to present

2002 to 2018

The by-election was called following the resignation of Cllr. Audrey-Marie M. Yates.

1978 to 2002

References

External links
Council Elections 2006 results - Fairfield
Conservative Councillors for Croydon.
 London Borough of Croydon map of wards.
Fairfield Halls web site
Vanguard Way

Ward results

Wards of the London Borough of Croydon